Dichomeris ochthophora is a moth in the family Gelechiidae. It was described by Edward Meyrick in 1936. It is found in China (Hong Kong, Gansu, Jiangxi, Yunnan), Taiwan and Japan.

The wingspan is 13.5-14.5 mm. The forewings are yellowish ochreous with well-developed dark fuscous streaks along the anterior margin and posterior margin.

The larvae feed on Eriobotrya japonica, Rhaphiolepis umbellata and Photinia lucida.

References

Moths described in 1936
ochthophora